Ylenia Carabott (born 2 March 1989) is a Maltese football forward who plays for Women's National League Southern Premier Division side Gillingham. During her time in Malta with Hibernians, she won the top scorer award for 9 times and in 8 consecutive seasons. She also finished runner up in the best player award in 3 seasons and was also nominated for the Malta Sports Woman of the year where she finished with the top 5.

Club career
In her home country Carabott has played for Raiders, Hibernians and Birkirkara, winning a series of league and cup titles.

Outside of Malta she has had spells with Swedish sides Alby FF and Ange IF, and Italian Serie B side Chievo. In August 2020 she signed for Belgian First Division team Charleroi.

In September 2021, Carabott joined English club Keynsham Town, but failed to score in 14 league appearances for the side as they were relegated from the National League Southern Premier Division. In July 2022 she signed for Gillingham of the National League Southern Premier Division.

Honours
Hibernians

 Maltese Women's League: 2004–05, 2005–06, 2006–07, 2008–09, 2014–15, 2015–16
 Malta Women's Knock Out: 2005–06, 2014–15, 2015–16
 Malta Women's Super Cup: 2006–07, 2007–08, 2012–13, 2013–14, 2014–15, 2015–16, 2016–17

Birkirkara

 Maltese Women's League: 2018–19
 Malta Women's Knock Out: 2018–19
 Malta Women's Super Cup: 2018–19

Individual

 Maltese Women's League Top Scorer: 2006–07, 2008–09, 2009–2010, 2010–11, 2011–12, 2012–13, 2013–14, 2014–15, 2015–16, 2016–17

See also
List of Malta women's international footballers

References

External links 
 

1989 births
Living people
Maltese women's footballers
Malta women's international footballers
Women's association football forwards
Keynsham Town L.F.C. players